Gabriel Héctor Ascencio Mansilla (born 8 July 1953) is a Chilean politician and lawyer who served as deputy of his country.

In 2021, he announced his retirement of the Chamber of Deputies of Chile.

References

External links
 BCN Profile

1953 births
20th-century Chilean lawyers
University of Chile alumni
Christian Democratic Party (Chile) politicians
People from Aysén Region
20th-century Chilean politicians
21st-century Chilean politicians
Living people